The Commonwealth of Massachusetts is home to a large number of Hispanic and Latino residents. As of the 2020 Census, Hispanics and Latinos accounted for 12% of the total state's population (that is; 627,654 residents of Hispanic or Latino ethnic origin) 

Starting in the 1960’s, there was large influx of Hispanic immigrants to the state of Massachusetts mainly because of the economic opportunities the state has to offer. The Latino population in the state of Massachusetts continues to grow at a rapid rate.

Statistics 
Massachusetts is one of six states in the country that can attribute nearly all of its growth from 2000 to 2010 to the Hispanic population.
69% of Massachusetts' Hispanic population is native-born. This can be attributed to the large Puerto Rican population.
The largest population of Puerto Ricans in the United States, per capita, is in Holyoke, Massachusetts, comprising 44.8% of all residents in the 2010 Census.
Massachusetts ranks first in the nation (out of 50 U.S. states and Washington, D.C.) for percentage of Hispanics of non-Mexican origin, with 94% of the Hispanic population being of non-Mexican origin.
The median age for all Hispanics is 26; significantly lower than for non-Hispanic Whites (median age: 43). For native-born Hispanics, the median age is 20; for foreign-born Hispanics, the median age is 38.
33% of all Hispanic persons that were 15 years and older were married (26% for native-born Hispanics; 43% for foreign-born Hispanics); compared to 49% for non-Hispanic Whites and 33% for non-Hispanic Blacks.
41% of Hispanic youths were in poverty, compared to 8% for non-Hispanic White youths and 26% for non-Hispanic Black youths.
25% of Hispanic adults were in poverty, compared to 8% for non-Hispanic White adults and 19% for non-Hispanic Black adults.
10% of all Hispanics in Massachusetts are uninsured (6% for native-born Hispanics; 17% for  foreign-born Hispanics); compared to 3% for non-Hispanic Whites and 8% for non-Hispanic Blacks.
There were 149,000 Hispanics enrolled in K-12, accounting for 15% of all K-12 students.
22% of Hispanic persons age 5 and older spoke only English at home, while 78% of Hispanic persons age 5 and older spoke a language other than English at home.
According to a 2019 projection conducted by Gaston Institute, by 2035, the Latino population in the state of Massachusetts will grow to over 1.15 million and will represent roughly 15.3 percent of the population. This projection also concludes that the Latinos already living in the state of Massachusetts will have more of an impact on the future population than will future immigrants.
According to a 2019 Census provided by the Migration Policy Institute, there are estimated to be around 209,000 unauthorized immigrants in the state of Massachusetts. Of that 209,000, 20 percent of those unauthorized immigrants are born in Brazil. However, only 12 percent of that 209,000 live below the poverty line.

Hispanic or Latino by type

Hispanic and Latino communities 
The largest Hispanic and Latino communities in Massachusetts are as follow:

References

Notes 

Demographics of Massachusetts